Bundesrechnungshof/Auswärtiges Amt is a station on the Bonn Stadtbahn in Bonn, Germany. The Bonn Stadt-Bahn lines that go through this station are: 16, 63, 66, 67 and 68.

The stop is beneath the Adenauerallee, directly lain at the Bundesrechnungshof.

References

External links 
 

Buildings and structures in Bonn
Railway stations in North Rhine-Westphalia
Underground rapid transit in Germany
Cologne-Bonn Stadtbahn stations
Railway stations in Germany opened in 1975